Frithuwold may refer to:

Frithuwold of Surrey, 7th century King of Surrey
Frithuwald of Bernicia, 6th century King of Bernicia
 Frithuwald, Bishop of Whithorn, 735–763x764